Khao Phanom Bencha National Park is a national park in Krabi Province, Thailand. The park is named for Khao Phanom Bencha mountain and protects an area of virgin rainforest and rare wildlife.

Geography
The park's area is 31,325 rai ~  and reaches its highest point at the  peak of Khao Phanom Bencha, part of a mountain range running north to south.

Attractions
Nearby Huai Sakhe Falls is a waterfall of three cascades.

Khao Pheung is a cave featuring stalactites and stalagmites. The Khao Phanom Bencha mountain peak is thickly forested and climbable on a multi-day trek.

Flora and fauna
The park's forest includes such tree species as teak, takian, Dipterocarpus alatus, Lagerstroemia, Magnolia champaca and Parkia speciosa. At lower elevations Calamus palms and bamboo are found.

Animal species include clouded leopard, Sumatran serow, tapir, black bear and mouse deer. Numerous monkey species reside within the park such as langur, lar gibbon and stump-tailed macaque.

Khao Phanom Bencha is home to over 200 bird species and is a significant bird-spotting area. Species include white-crowned and helmeted hornbill, white-rumped shama and argus pheasant. An extremely rare bird here is the endangered Gurney's pitta.

See also
List of national parks of Thailand
List of Protected Areas Regional Offices of Thailand

References

National parks of Thailand
Geography of Krabi province
Tourist attractions in Krabi province